Zhulin may refer to
Zhulin (surname), a Russian surname
Zhuang Zhulin (1900–1973), Chinese educator
Fayuan Zhulin, a Buddhist encyclopedia
Zhulin, a village in Wufeng, Hsinchu, Taiwan
Zhulin, Qichun County (株林镇), a town in Qichun County, Huanggang, Hubei, China
Zhulin, a village in Stryi Raion, Lviv Oblast, Ukraine

See also
Zhu Lin (disambiguation)
Zulin (disambiguation)